This is a list of 144 species in Malthinus, a genus of soldier beetles in the family Cantharidae.

Malthinus species

 Malthinus aetolicus Wittmer, 1974 g
 Malthinus alexanderi Fender, 1966 i g
 Malthinus armipes Kiesenwetter, 1871 g
 Malthinus aspoecki Wittmer, 1974 g
 Malthinus atripennis LeConte, 1881 i g
 Malthinus axillaris Kiesenwetter, 1852 g
 Malthinus balteatus Suffrian, 1851 g
 Malthinus bandamensis Palm, 1975 g
 Malthinus bicolor (LeConte, 1884) i
 Malthinus biglianii Fiori, 1915 g
 Malthinus biguttatus (Linnaeus, 1758) g
 Malthinus bilineatus Kiesenwetter, 1852 g
 Malthinus brancuccii Wittmer, 1978 g
 Malthinus bulgaricus Svihla, 1990 g
 Malthinus chisosensis Fender, 1963 i g
 Malthinus cincticollis Kiesenwetter, 1865 g
 Malthinus conspicuus  g
 Malthinus cordobensis Wittmer, 1971 g
 Malthinus corsicanus Constantin, 1975 g
 Malthinus creticus Wittmer, 1971 g
 Malthinus croceicollis Wollaston, 1862 g
 Malthinus cuspidatus Fender, 1963 i g
 Malthinus dalmatinus Pic, 1902 g
 Malthinus danieli (Kuśka & Kania, 2010) g
 Malthinus danielssoni Wittmer, 1995 g
 Malthinus deceptor Baudi, 1893 g
 Malthinus depauperatus Wollaston, 1862 g
 Malthinus devillei Abeille de Perrin, 1898 g
 Malthinus difficilis LeConte, 1851 i g b
 Malthinus diffusus Kiesenwetter, 1865 g
 Malthinus dimorphus Wittmer, 1935 g
 Malthinus dromioides Bourgeois, 1885 g
 Malthinus dryocoetes Rottenberg, 1870 g
 Malthinus elbursensis Wittmer, 1978 g
 Malthinus espadanensis Wittmer, 1981 g
 Malthinus euboeicus Wittmer, 1974 g
 Malthinus expansus Wittmer, 1986 g
 Malthinus facialis Thomson, 1864 g
 Malthinus fasciatus (Olivier, 1790) g
 Malthinus fenchihuensis Wittmer, 1979 g
 Malthinus fjellandi Fender, 1963 i g
 Malthinus flaveolus (Herbst, 1786) g
 Malthinus foliiformis Wittmer, 1975 g
 Malthinus forcepiformis Wittmer, 1978 g
 Malthinus frontalis (Marsham, 1802) g
 Malthinus fuerteventurensis Palm, 1975 g
 Malthinus ganglbaueri Wittmer, 1974 g
 Malthinus garganicus Fiori, 1915 g
 Malthinus geigei Wittmer, 1971 g
 Malthinus geniculatus Kiesenwetter, 1859 g
 Malthinus glabellus Kiesenwetter, 1852 g
 Malthinus graecus Wittmer, 1986 g
 Malthinus gratiosus Pic, 1901 g
 Malthinus huachucae Fender, 1951 i g
 Malthinus ilisicus Wittmer, 1974 g
 Malthinus insignipes Pic, 1907 g
 Malthinus ionicus Pic, 1901 g
 Malthinus israelsoni Palm, 1975 g
 Malthinus kafkai Svihla, 2002 g
 Malthinus khuzistanicus Wittmer, 1972 g
 Malthinus kiesenwetteri C.Brisout de Barneville, 1863 g
 Malthinus knulli Fender, 1963 i g
 Malthinus kraatzi Pic, 1900 g
 Malthinus lacteifrons Marseul, 1878 g
 Malthinus laevicollis Kiesenwetter, 1859 g
 Malthinus laticollis Pic, 1900 g
 Malthinus lindbergi Palm, 1975 g
 Malthinus lituratus Motschulsky, 1853 g
 Malthinus longicornis Kiesenwetter, 1865 g
 Malthinus madoniensis Svihla, 2002 g
 Malthinus malkini Wittmer, 1986 g
 Malthinus mandli Wittmer, 1966 g
 Malthinus marginicollis Ganglbauer, 1906 g
 †Malthinus masoni Pankowski & Fanti, 2022 g
 Malthinus maspalomensis Palm, 1975 g
 Malthinus minimus Palm, 1975 g
 Malthinus moravicus Svihla, 1997 g
 Malthinus mucoreus Kiesenwetter, 1879 g
 Malthinus multinotatus Pic, 1929 g
 Malthinus mutabilis Wollaston, 1862 g
 Malthinus neapolitanus Pic, 1905 g
 Malthinus neglectus Palm, 1975 g
 Malthinus nigerrimus Constantin, 1975 g
 Malthinus nigrescens Palm, 1975 g
 Malthinus notsui Wittmer, 1984 g
 Malthinus obscuripes Kiesenwetter, 1866 g
 Malthinus occipitalis LeConte, 1851 i g b  (yellow-tipped soldier beetle)
 Malthinus ohbai Wittmer, 1984 g
 Malthinus olympiacus Wittmer, 1974 g
 Malthinus orbiculatus N.Takahashi g
 Malthinus ornatus Rosenhauer, 1856 g
 Malthinus palingensis Wittmer, 1993 g
 Malthinus pallidipes Fairmaire, 1884 g
 Malthinus panachaicus Wittmer, 1974 g
 Malthinus parallelus Wittmer, 1974 g
 Malthinus parnassicus Wittmer, 1974 g
 Malthinus persicus Pic, 1901 g
 Malthinus pseudobiguttatus Constantin, 1975 g
 Malthinus pseudopersicus Wittmer, 1972 g
 Malthinus pseudoreflexus Svihla, 1994 g
 Malthinus pseudoscriptus Wittmer, 1971 g
 Malthinus punctatus (Geoffroy, 1785) g
 Malthinus quadrimaculatus Fender, 1951 i g
 Malthinus rauschi Wittmer, 1978 g
 Malthinus reductelineatus Pic, 1922 g
 Malthinus reflexus Wittmer, 1974 g
 Malthinus rhaphidiceps Kiesenwetter, 1852 g
 Malthinus robustus Motschulsky, 1853 g
 Malthinus rothi Fender, 1972 i g
 Malthinus rubricollis Baudi di Selve, 1859 g
 Malthinus rufifrons (Motschulsky, 1859) g
 Malthinus sancticatalinus Fender, 1972 i g
 Malthinus sanpedroensis Wittmer, 1971 g
 Malthinus scapularis Marseul, 1877 g
 Malthinus schoeni Svihla, 2002 g
 Malthinus scriptipennis Pic, 1900 g
 Malthinus scriptoides Wittmer, 1971 g
 Malthinus scriptus Kiesenwetter, 1852 g
 Malthinus scutellaris Rosenhauer, 1856 g
 Malthinus seriepunctatus Kiesenwetter, 1851 g
 Malthinus serrulatus N.Takahashi g
 Malthinus shimomurai Wittmer, 1984 g
 Malthinus sicanus Kiesenwetter, 1871 g
 Malthinus simplicipes Pic, 1899 g
 Malthinus sinensis Pic, 1910 g
 Malthinus sordidus Kiesenwetter, 1871 g
 Malthinus sowerestanus Fender, 1972 i g
 Malthinus ssulingensis Wittmer, 1993 g
 Malthinus stigmatus Kiesenwetter, 1866 g
 Malthinus subcostatus Schaeffer, 1908 i g
 Malthinus taiwanoniger Wittmer, 1979 g
 Malthinus taiwanus Wittmer, 1984 g
 Malthinus temperei Constantin, 1975 g
 Malthinus texanus Wittmer, 1981 i g b
 Malthinus tricolor Fender, 1951 i g
 Malthinus trinotaticeps Pic, 1951 g
 Malthinus turcicus Pic, 1899 g
 Malthinus validiceps Pic, 1928 g
 Malthinus vartiani Wittmer, 1966 g
 Malthinus versatilis Delkeskamp, 1939 g
 Malthinus verticalis Pic, 1930 g
 Malthinus vitellinus Kiesenwetter, 1865 g
 Malthinus vixlimbatus Wittmer, 1984 g
 Malthinus wewalkai Wittmer, 1980 g
 Malthinus yangmingensis Wittmer, 1984 g

Data sources: i = ITIS, c = Catalogue of Life, g = GBIF, b = Bugguide.net

References

Malthinus
Articles created by Qbugbot